"A Love Story in the Making" is a song recorded by American country music artist Linda Davis.  It was released in April 1996 as the second single from the album Some Things Are Meant to Be.  The song reached #33 on the Billboard Hot Country Singles & Tracks chart.  The song was written by Al Anderson and Craig Wiseman.

Chart performance

References

1996 singles
1996 songs
Linda Davis songs
Songs written by Al Anderson (NRBQ)
Songs written by Craig Wiseman
Arista Records singles